Yang Zhaoxuan and Zhang Kailin were the defending champions, but both players chose not to participate.

Anna Blinkova and Alla Kudryavtseva won the title, defeating Paula Kania and Maryna Zanevska in the final 6–1, 6–4.

Seeds

Draw

References
Main Draw

Aegon Ilkley Trophy - Women's Doubles